Penllyn may refer to the following places:

United States
Penllyn, a village in Lower Gwynedd Township, Montgomery County, Pennsylvania

Wales
Penllyn, Gwynedd, a former civil parish in Gwynedd (1894–1974)
Penllyn, Vale of Glamorgan, a village and community in the Vale of Glamorgan
Penllyn (cantref), an ancient cantref of Gwynedd

See also
Penllyn railway station (disambiguation)
Pen-Llyn, Anglesey
Llŷn Peninsula, Gwynedd, known in Welsh as